This page has a list of articles related to environmental history, the study of human interaction with the natural world over time.

Articles titled "History of ..."

History of agriculture in India (from ancient times)
History of agriculture in the People's Republic of China (from ancient times)
History of agriculture in the United States
History of the anti-nuclear movement (from before 1945)
History of the bicycle (from 1817 with archetype)
History of biotechnology
History of climate change science (from the early 19th century)
History of coal mining (from ancient times)
History of coal mining in the United States
History of cycling
History of cycling in New Zealand (from the 1860s)
History of the diesel car (from 1933)
History of electric power transmission (from the late 19th century)
History of electricity sector in Canada (from the late 19th century)
History of electricity supply in Queensland
History of the electric vehicle (from the mid-19th century)
History of ethanol fuel in Brazil (from the 1970s)
History of flooding in Canada
History of Hydro-Québec (from 1944)
History of the jet engine
History of manufactured gas (from the 18th century)
History of nanotechnology (from the 1980s)
History of nuclear weapons (from the 1930s)
History of numerical weather prediction (from 1950)
History of the oil shale industry (from the mid-19th century)
History of the oil tanker (since 1863?)
History of organic farming (from ancient times)
History of passive solar building design
History of the petroleum industry in Canada (from the late 1950s?)
History of the petroleum industry in Canada (frontier exploration and development) (from 1920)
History of the petroleum industry in Canada (natural gas) (most significantly from 1980)
History of the petroleum industry in Canada (natural gas liquids) (from 1914)
History of the petroleum industry in Canada (oil sands and heavy oil) (from 1719)
History of the petroleum industry in the United States (from the early 19th century)
History of plug-in hybrids (most significantly from 2002)
History of rail transport (from nearly 500 years ago) (See also: :Category:History of rail transport.)
History of rapid transit (from 1863)
History of road transport (from ancient times)
History of Statoil (1972–2007)
History of the steam engine (from the first century CE)
History of steam road vehicles (experimentally from the 17th century)
History of sustainability (from the earliest civilizations)
History of the Venezuelan oil industry (from before European colonization)
History of waste management (from ancient times)
History of water filters (from ancient times)
History of water fluoridation (from c. 1901, with research on cause Colorado brown stain)
History of water supply and sanitation (from ancient times)
History of wildfire suppression in the United States
Environmental history of Latin America

Timelines

Timeline of alcohol fuel
Timeline of the Deepwater Horizon oil spill
Timeline of the Deepwater Horizon oil spill (May 2010)
Timeline of the Deepwater Horizon oil spill (June 2010)
Timeline of the Deepwater Horizon oil spill (July 2010)
Timeline of the Deepwater Horizon oil spill (August 2010)
Timeline of environmental events
Timeline of environmental history
Timeline of the Fukushima Daiichi nuclear disaster
Timeline of the Fukushima Daini nuclear accidents
Timeline of genetically modified organisms
Timeline of history of environmentalism
Timeline of major U.S. environmental and occupational health regulation
Timeline of Minamata disease
Timeline of the New Zealand environment
Timeline of nuclear weapons development
Timeline of relief efforts after the 2010 Chile earthquake
Timeline of relief efforts after the 2010 Haiti earthquake

Environmental history books

Miscellaneous topics
:Category:Environment by year
Growth of photovoltaics
Instrumental temperature record
List of years in the environment
Table of years in the environment
Temperature record of the past 1000 years

Gallery

See also
:Category:Environment by year
Lists of environmental topics

References

External links
Environmental History (scholarly journal)
Environmentalhistory.org (timeline)
American Society for Environmental History
Environmental History Resources
Historical Topics | US EPA
Environmental-History
Environmental History on the Internet
JSTOR: All Volumes and Issues - Browse - Environmental History [1996–2007 (Volumes 1–12)]
JSTOR: All Volumes and Issues - Browse - Forest & Conservation History [1990–1995 (Volumes 34–39)]
JSTOR: All Volumes and Issues - Browse - Environmental Review: ER [1976–1989 (Volumes 1–13)]
JSTOR: All Volumes and Issues - Browse - Environmental History Review [1990–1995 (Volumes 14–19)]
JSTOR: All Volumes and Issues - Browse - Journal of Forest History [1974–1989 (Volumes 18–33)]
JSTOR: All Volumes and Issues - Browse - Forest History [1957–1974 (Volumes 1–17)]

History
Envir